The 1966–67 A Group was the 19th season of the A Football Group, the top Bulgarian professional league for association football clubs, since its establishment in 1948.

Overview
It was contested by 16 teams, and Botev Plovdiv won the championship.

League standings

Results

Champions
Botev Plovdiv

Top scorers

References

External links
Bulgaria - List of final tables (RSSSF)
1966–67 Statistics of A Group at a-pfg.com

First Professional Football League (Bulgaria) seasons
Bulgaria
1966–67 in Bulgarian football